Fukuchiyama Dam is a gravity dam located in Fukuoka Prefecture in Japan. The dam is used for flood control and water supply. The catchment area of the dam is 4.7 km2. The dam impounds about 13  ha of land when full and can store 2710 thousand cubic meters of water. The construction of the dam was started on 1975 and completed in 2003.

References

Dams in Fukuoka Prefecture
2003 establishments in Japan